John Downey may refer to:

John G. Downey (1827–1894), Governor of California
John T. Downey (1930–2014), former CIA officer shot down over communist China and imprisoned for two decades
John V. Downey (c. 1884–1960), New York politician
John W. Downey (1927–2004), contemporary classical composer
John Downey (Iowa politician) (1834–1906), Irish-born American politician in Iowa
John Downey (RAF officer) (1920–2010)
John Anthony Downey, accused of carrying out the Hyde Park bombing in 1982

See also
John Downie (1925–2013), Scottish footballer
John Downey Works, Californian senator